This is a list of films based on Slavic mythology.

See also 
 List of films based on Germanic mythology
 List of films based on Greco-Roman mythology

Slavic mythology
 
Films based on folklore